Andrew Jackson O'Shaughnessy FRHS (born 1959) is an academic historian, Vice President of the Thomas Jefferson Foundation at Monticello in Virginia, the Saunders Director of the Robert H. Smith International Center for Jefferson Studies at Monticello, and Professor of History at the University of Virginia.

Biography
Born in Cheshire in 1959, Andrew O'Shaughnessy was educated at Bedford School and at Oriel College, University of Oxford. After completing his B.A. and D.Phil at Oriel College, Oxford, he taught at Eton College. He was subsequently appointed as a visiting professor at Southern Methodist University in Dallas and as Professor of American History at the University of Wisconsin Oshkosh, where he was chair of the History Department between 1998 and 2003.

O'Shaughnessy is the author of An Empire Divided: The American Revolution and the British Caribbean (2000). and The Men Who Lost America: British Leadership, the American Revolution and the Fate of the Empire (New Haven: Yale University Press, 2013), which received eight national awards including the New York Historical Society American History Book Prize, the George Washington Book Prize, and the Daughters of the American Revolution Excellence in American History Book Award. His most recent book is The Illimitable Freedom of the Human Mind: Thomas Jefferson's Idea of a University (Charlottesville: University of Virginia Press, 2021).

A Fellow of the Royal Historical Society, O'Shaughnessy is co-editor of Old World, New World: America and Europe in the Age of Jefferson (2010), The Founding of Thomas Jefferson's University (2019), and the Jeffersonian American Series, published by the University of Virginia Press.

O'Shaughnessy's father, John O'Shaughnessy, is an Emeritus Professor of the Columbia University Business School. His brother, Nicholas O'Shaughnessy, is Professor of Communications at Queen Mary College, London University.

He is a joint citizen of the United Kingdom and the United States.

Awards and honours
 2015 Distinguished Book Award from Society for Military History for The Men Who Lost America
 2015 The National Society Daughters of the American Revolution Excellence in American History Book Award.
 2014 New York Historical Society American History Book Prize for The Men Who Lost America
 2014 George Washington Book Prize for The Men Who Lost America
 2014 Cincinnati History Prize (sponsored by the Society of the Cincinnati in the State of New Jersey).
 2014 The American Revolution Round Table of Richmond Book Award
 2014 Fraunces Tavern Museum Book Award
 2013 The New York Round Table of the American Revolution Book of the Year. 
 2013 Great Midwest Book Festival Award in Regional Literature
 Finalist, 2014 Cundill Prize in Historical Literature.
 Finalist, 2013 Guggenheim-Lehrman Prize in Military History.

References

External links 
 https://www.monticello.org/research-education/for-scholars/international-center-for-jefferson-studies/author-andrew-o-shaughnessy/about-the-author/
 https://www.c-span.org/person/?1031109/AndrewJacksonOShaughnessy
 https://history.virginia.edu/people/profile/ao2k

Living people
Alumni of Oriel College, Oxford
Academics of the University of Oxford
Southern Methodist University faculty
University of Virginia faculty
University of Wisconsin–Oshkosh faculty
British writers
British emigrants to the United States
People educated at Bedford School
British expatriate academics in the United States
Fellows of the Royal Historical Society
1959 births